Sychanske is a village in the Starobilsk Raion (district) in the Luhansk Oblast (province) of eastern Ukraine.

Starobilsk Raion

Villages in Staroblisk Raion